Hyvinkään Tahko is a Finnish sports club from Hyvinkää. It was founded in 1915. Hyvinkää Tahko has participated in many sports in Finland over the years, such as athletics, skiing and orienteering. Since 1980, the club's main successes have been in basketball and pesäpallo.

Hyvinkää Tahko has won the men's Finnish Pesäpallo Championship, (Superpesis) four times, between 1979 and 1981, and in 2007. The Women's Championship Tahko has won twice in 1979 and 1983. Tahko's home ground is the Pihkala Pesäpallo stadium.

Achievements 

Men's Pesäpallo

Superpesis

Finnish Cup

Winners - 1976, 1987

Women's Pesäpallo

Superpesis

Men's Basketball

Finnish League

Third Place - 1980, 1981

Pesäpallo
Sports teams in Finland